Kenta Chiba (born 4 April 1996) is a Japanese artistic gymnast. He won the silver medal in the men's team event at the 2018 Asian Games in Jakarta, Indonesia. He also won the bronze medal in the parallel bars event. He reached the final in both the horizontal bar and pommel horse events.

At the 2017 Summer Universiade held in Taipei, Taiwan, he won the gold medal in the men's team all-around event.

References

External links 
 

Living people
1996 births
Place of birth missing (living people)
Japanese male artistic gymnasts
Universiade medalists in gymnastics
Universiade gold medalists for Japan
Medalists at the 2017 Summer Universiade
Gymnasts at the 2018 Asian Games
Medalists at the 2018 Asian Games
Asian Games silver medalists for Japan
Asian Games bronze medalists for Japan
Asian Games medalists in gymnastics
21st-century Japanese people